Bulbarrow Hill is a  hill near Woolland, five miles west of Blandford Forum and ten miles (16 km) north of Dorchester in Dorset, England.  The chalk hill is part of the scarp of Dorset Downs, which form the western end of the Southern England Chalk Formation.  Part of the hill is used for arable agriculture, but most is calcareous grassland.  The hill overlooks the Blackmore Vale, and offers views of Dorset, Somerset, Wiltshire and Devon.

Rawlsbury Camp, a five acre Iron Age hill fort, is situated on a promontory of the hill.  Little remains of the camp except the twin embankments and intermediate ditch which surrounded it.  The hill gets its name from the several barrows that adorn the hill.  Additionally, a medieval trackway crosses the ridge.

The hill is a popular launch site for paragliders.

The TV presenter Jack Hargreaves who died in 1994 had his ashes spread on Bulbarrow Hill above his home, Raven Cottage.

Radio towers
Bulbarrow Hill has been used for radio towers since 1942. In 1942, the RAF installed a Gee station there as the master of the "southern" Gee chain. This station had wooden masts. the Gee station was used until 1957. The USAF then used the site together with a site at Ringstead.
As of 2016, the site is used for telecommunication masts. The twin radio transmitter towers are used by the emergency services.

In popular culture
The British band, Half Man Half Biscuit, refer to Bulbarrow Hill in the track "Third Track Main Camera Four Minutes", on their 2000 album Trouble Over Bridgwater, in which the narrator bemoans the increasing popularity of 'trendy' holiday destinations such as Cuba and Iceland, saying "I’d much rather go down to Dorset, with its wonderful Bulbarrow Hill".

References

External links

 The Megalithic Portal: Rawlsbury Camp

Hills of Dorset